Ataköy Dam is a dam in Tokat Province, Turkey, built between 1975 and 1977.

See also
List of dams and reservoirs in Turkey

External links
DSI

Dams in Tokat Province
Dams completed in 1977